Ons' Lieve Heer op Solder (OLHOS) is a 17th-century canal house, house church, and museum in the city center of Amsterdam, The Netherlands. The Catholic Church was built on the top three floors of the canal house during the 1660s. It is an important example of a "schuilkerk", or "clandestine church" in which Catholics and other religious dissenters from the seventeenth century Dutch Reformed Church, unable to worship in public, held services. The church has been open as a museum since 28 April 1888, and has 85,000 visitors annually.

Canal house

The canal house on the 14th century canal Oudezijds Voorburgwal, currently on number 40, was built in 1630. Between 1661 and 1663 the top three floors of the house were changed into a house church. The building was renovated in the 18th and 19th century.

Museum
After the Church of St Nicholas was opened, the house church was no longer in use as a church. On 28 April 1888 it opened its doors for the public as a museum, making it the second oldest museum in Amsterdam, after Rijksmuseum Amsterdam. The museum was previously named Museum Amstelkring and is now called Museum Ons' Lieve Heer op Solder (English: Museum Our Lord in the Attic). Annually, about 85,000 people visit the museum.

The museum contains the front room, the between room, the hall, the church, the Lady chapel, the confessional, the Jaap Leeuwenberg hall, and the 17th-century kitchen.

The property has been listed as rijksmonument 6107.

Collection

References

External links

Churches in Amsterdam
Museums in Amsterdam
Rijksmonuments in Amsterdam
Museums established in 1888
1888 establishments in the Netherlands
Houses completed in 1630
Religious buildings and structures completed in 1630
Religious organizations established in the 1660s
1663 establishments in the Dutch Republic
Religious museums in the Netherlands
History museums in the Netherlands
Historic house museums in the Netherlands
1630 establishments in the Dutch Republic
19th-century religious buildings and structures in the Netherlands